Arthur is an unincorporated community in Paulding County, Ohio, United States.

References

Unincorporated communities in Paulding County, Ohio
Unincorporated communities in Ohio